Millington is a village in Tuscola County, Michigan, United States. The population was 1,072 at the 2010 census. The village is located within Millington Township.

Millington and the surrounding area is known as a "bedroom community" of both Saginaw and Flint.  Primary employment is manufacturing related and agricultural.

Geography

Arbela Township, located west of Millington, is closely associated and considered part of the Millington Cardinal community.

The Murphy Lake State Game Area is located approximately four miles east-northeast of Millington.

Climate
This climatic region is typified by large seasonal temperature differences, with warm to hot (and often humid) summers and cold (sometimes severely cold) winters.  According to the Köppen Climate Classification system, Millington has a humid continental climate, abbreviated "Dfb" on climate maps.

Demographics

2010 census
As of the census of 2010, there were 1,072 people, 420 households, a. The racial makeup of the village was 94.9% White, 1.5% African American, 0.6% Native American, 0.6% Asian, 0.9% from other races, and 1.6% from two or more races. Hispanic or Latino of any race were 2.5% of the population.

There were 420 households, of which 37.9% had children under the age of 18 living with them, 46.9% were married couples living together, 14.8% had a female householder with no husband present, 6.0% had a male householder with no wife present, and 32.4% were non-families. 27.9% of all households were made up of individuals, and 14% had someone living alone who was 65 years of age or older. The average household size was 2.55 and the average family size was 3.05.

The median age in the village was 32.8 years. 28.5% of residents were under the age of 18; 10.9% were between the ages of 18 and 24; 26.3% were from 25 to 44; 19.7% were from 45 to 64; and 14.6% were 65 years of age or older.

2000 census
As of the census of 2000, there were 1,137 people, 446 households, and 306 families residing in the village. The racial makeup of the village was 98.86% White, 0.35% African American, 0.18% Native American, 0.09% Asian, 0.18% from other races, and 0.35% from two or more races. Hispanic or Latino of any race were 0.53% of the population.

There were 446 households, out of which 35.4% had children under the age of 18 living with them, 49.3% were married couples living together, 16.8% had a female householder with no husband present, and 31.2% were non-families. 27.4% of all households were made up of individuals, and 13.5% had someone living alone who was 65 years of age or older.  The average household size was 2.51 and the average family size was 3.05.

In the village, the population was spread out, with 27.4% under the age of 18, 10.1% from 18 to 24, 28.1% from 25 to 44, 20.1% from 45 to 64, and 14.3% who were 65 years of age or older.  The median age was 33 years. For every 100 females, there were 82.5 males.  For every 100 females age 18 and over, there were 79.2 males.

The median income for a household in the village was $35,223, and the median income for a family was $42,353. Males had a median income of $32,381 versus $22,625 for females. The per capita income for the village was $17,195.  About 6.6% of families and 10.2% of the population were below the poverty line, including 17.2% of those under age 18 and 4.3% of those age 65 or over.

Education
Millington is served by a K-12  public school system, (Millington Public Schools) and a K-8 Lutheran (St. Paul Lutheran) parochial school. Millington High School is often referred to as "Corky's School" by the Detroit Free Press's Mick McCabe (the Son of Swami) when McCabe makes his high school football picks for the late Corky Meinecke, a Millington High graduate and former Detroit Free Press sports writer.
×

References

External links
Village website

Villages in Tuscola County, Michigan
Villages in Michigan